Gustave-Claude-Étienne Courtois, also known as Gustave Courtois (18 May 1852 in Pusey, Haute-Saône – 23 November 1923 in Neuilly-sur-Seine) was a French painter, a representative of the academic style of art.

Life

Courtois was born 18 May 1852 in Pusey, Haute-Saône, France to an unwed mother who was devoted to him. Early in life, Courtois revealed an interest in art and entered the École municipale de dessin in Vesoul (Franche-Comté). His drawings were shown to Jean-Léon Gérôme, and in 1869, Gérôme encouraged Courtois to enter the École nationale supérieure des Beaux-Arts in Paris. Through his life, Courtois was in close friendship with fellow student Pascal Dagnan-Bouveret, together with whom he maintained a fashionable studio in Neuilly-sur-Seine from the 1880s.

He taught painting at Académie de la Grande Chaumière, Académie Colarossi, Paris, where Harriet Campbell Foss, Georges d'Espagnat, Eva Bonnier, Emma Cheves Wilkins, and Dora Hitz were students.

Courtois exhibited at the Salon de Paris, receiving a third-place medal in 1878 and a second-place medal in 1880. He was awarded a gold medal at the Exposition Universelle in 1889 and exhibited at the Salon de la Société Nationale des Beaux-Arts from 1911 to 1914. He was made a Chevalier in the Légion d'Honneur.

His paintings can be seen in the art galleries of Besançon, Marseille, Bordeaux, and Luxembourg. He was a Chevalier of the Legion of Honor. Among his students were Willard Dryden Paddock,  Mary Rose Hill Burton, and Sara Page.

References

Sources
Robert Fernier. Gustave Courtois: 1852-1923, 1943.
Gabriel P. Weisberg. Against the Modern: Dagnan-Bouveret and the Transformation of the Academic Tradition, 2002.

External links

"Gustave Claude Etienne Courtois", Artnet
"The New Bonnet", Christies

1853 births
1923 deaths
Chevaliers of the Légion d'honneur
19th-century French painters
French male painters
20th-century French painters
20th-century French male artists
École des Beaux-Arts alumni
People from Vesoul
Members of the Ligue de la patrie française
Académie Colarossi alumni
19th-century French male artists